Dingfelder (1903) was an automobile brand produced by the Dingfelder Motor Company, which was located at 958 Jefferson Street in Detroit, and had an auto garage at 41–43 Washington Street.

History
In 1903 they produced a number of two-passenger runabouts. In 1904 they manufactured boats.

Specification
The Dingfelder weighed 

It had custom designed engine known as the Maximotor.  The early model was a  one-cylinder motor.

Reviews
One magazine reported that "Mr (Max) Dingfelder is held in high esteem for his honorable business methods and sterling integrity," and "the machine has been very well received by the local trade and a nice business is anticipated."

Engines
Around 1911 to 1913 the range expanded, models included four- and six-cylinder in-line and V-8 water-cooled engines.

 Type: In-line, 4 cylinders, liquid-cooled
 Power rating: 52 KW (70 hp) at 1,500 rpm
 Displacement: 7.0 L (430 cu in)
 Bore and Stroke: 12.7 cm (5.0 in) x 14.0 cm (5.5 in)
 Weight (wet): 118 kg (260 lb) (3.71 lb/hp)
 Date: 1912
 Dimensions:
 Length 104 .1 (41.0 in.),
 Width 40.6 cm (16.0 in.),
 Height 273.7 cm (9.0 in.)
 Inventory Number: A19500094005  

In addition to their present staff, the Maxlmotor makers, Detroit, have engaged the services of a celebrated Detroit automobile designer whose cars are being turned out at the rate of over 800 weekly. This engineer has worked a number of years in Europe at the plants where the foremost light engines of the world are built. He is co-operating with the Maximotor designer, Mr. Dingfelder. Among the recent purchasers of Maximotor engines is Mr. Lewis Matthews, official and part owner of the Malleable Stove Works of South Bend, Ind., who has now resigned to invest in an aviation enterprise.

Boats
While the car business did not survive into 1904, Max Dingfelder did better with boats, and won a big race that was sponsored by the Detroit Yacht Club in 1906 with his auto boat "999".

The Dingfelder Motor Co exhibited a six-cylinder 60 horsepower, a four-cylinder, 30-40 and a two-cylinder 15-20 at the 1908 Detroit motor show.

Flying machines and airplanes
Max Dingfelder patented a flying machine  The Maximotor 52 kW (70 hp) Model B-4 was the last of several that powered Thomas S. Baldwin's Red Devil III aircraft. Maximotors were used on aircraft such as those built by Wright, Curtiss, Bleriot, and Farman and Antoinette. He also got a patent (991,770) in 1911 for Stability and steering rudders

References

Vintage vehicles
Defunct motor vehicle manufacturers of the United States
Motor vehicle manufacturers based in Michigan
Manufacturing companies based in Detroit